The Beijing Organizing Committee for the 2022 Olympic and Paralympic Winter Games (北京2022年冬奥会和冬残奥会组织委员会) (BOCWOG) was a public institution with legal person status, responsible for the organisation and coordination of all the preparations and delivery of the 2022 Olympic and Paralympic Winter Games. It was located at the former steel plant of Shougang Corporation in Shijingshan District, Beijing. The executive board of the Beijing 2022 was its sole executive agency. The Chairman was Cai Qi, who is also a  CCP Politburo member and Beijing CCP secretary.

Organisation structure

Leadership

Departments

See also
2022 Winter Olympics
2022 Winter Paralympics

External links
Official website

2022 Winter Olympics
2022 Winter Paralympics